Samuel Robson “Rob” Walton (born October 27, 1944) is an American billionaire heir to the fortune of Walmart, the world's largest retailer.  He is the eldest son of Helen Walton and Sam Walton, and was chairman of Walmart from 1992 to 2015. As of October 2022, Walton had an estimated net worth of US$61 billion, making him the 18th richest person in the world. He is also the principal owner of the National Football League (NFL)'s Denver Broncos.

Early life and family

Rob Walton was born on October 27, 1944, in Tulsa, Oklahoma, the oldest of four children of Sam Walton (1918–1992), cofounder of Walmart, and Helen Walton (1919–2007). He has a younger brother, Jim Walton, and a younger sister, Alice Walton. Another brother, John Walton, died in 2005.

Walton attended The College of Wooster and graduated from the University of Arkansas in 1966 with a Bachelor of Science degree in business administration, where he was a member of the Lambda Chi Alpha fraternity. He received his juris doctor degree from Columbia Law School in 1969. Walton is also a trustee at The College of Wooster.

After graduation, Walton became a member of the law firm that represented Walmart, Conner & Winters in Tulsa, Oklahoma. In 1978, he left Tulsa to join Walmart as a senior vice president, and in 1982, he was appointed vice chairman. He was named chairman of the board of directors on April 7, 1992, two days after his father's death.

Along with his siblings, he has pledged about $2 billion to the Walton Family Foundation from 2008 to 2013.

On June 7, 2022, an ownership group led by Walton entered into an agreement to purchase the Denver Broncos from the estate of Pat Bowlen for $4.65 billion, which set the record for the most expensive sale of a sports franchise in history, subject to approval from the NFL's finance committee and a 3/4 majority of the full NFL ownership group. Former Secretary of State Condoleezza Rice was announced as added to the ownership group on July 11, 2022.  The family then announced on August 2, 2022, that Lewis Hamilton would be added to the ownership group. Walton delegated most day-to-day authority to his son-in-law,  Walmart chairman Greg Penner, who took over as CEO of the franchise and the public face of the ownership group.

Personal life
By the time he left Tulsa in 1978, Walton had three children, was divorced from his first wife, and had remarried to Carolyn Funk. He and Carolyn filed for divorce in 2000. He married his third wife Melani Lowman-Walton in 2005. His children include Carrie Walton Penner.

In 2022, due to a decline in Wal-Mart's share price, Rob and his siblings lost more than $27 billion.

Car collection 
Walton is a well-known collector of automobiles. His car collection is valued in excess of US$300 million and includes:

 Ferrari 250 GTO s/n 5575GT
 Ferrari 250 GTO s/n 3607
 Ferrari 250 SWB
 Ferrari 250 GT SWB California Spyder
 Ferrari 250 LM
 Ferrari 250 Testa Rossa
 Ferrari 275 GTB Competizione Speciale
 Ferrari 250 GT Zagato Berlinetta
 Ferrari 575 GT Zagato
 McLaren F1 #052, purchased from Lawrence Stroll.
 Shelby Daytona chassis CSX2286
 1963 Aston Martin DP215 Grand Touring Competition Prototype
 Ford GT40 MK1

References

External links
Official Wal-Mart biography
S. Robson Walton's campaign contributions
Rob Walton Refuses to Answer on Company’s Record in Local Communities - video report by Democracy Now!

1944 births
Living people
American billionaires
American car collectors
American chairpersons of corporations
American corporate directors
American retail chief executives
Businesspeople from Arkansas
Businesspeople from Tulsa, Oklahoma
Columbia Law School alumni
Directors of Walmart
Oklahoma lawyers
University of Arkansas alumni
S. Robson
Denver Broncos owners
Denver Broncos personnel